The Family Corleone is a 2012 novel by Ed Falco, based on an unproduced screenplay by Mario Puzo, who died in 1999. It is the prequel to Puzo's The Godfather. It was published by Grand Central Publishing and released May 8, 2012. It is the fifth and final book published in The Godfather novel series but, being a prequel, it is chronologically set first.

The novel, set in the Great Depression at the end of Prohibition, tells of how Vito Corleone consolidated his power to become the most powerful Don in New York City. Also, it tells of Sonny Corleone's inauguration into the family business and Tom Hagen's graduation from being an adopted member of the Corleone family before becoming the consigliere. The novel also reveals how Luca Brasi first became associated with the Corleones, and introduces a number of new characters, including the crime boss Giuseppe Mariposa.

Plot 
In 1933 New York City, 17-year-old Sonny Corleone is aware that his father Vito Corleone's olive oil business is a cover for his Mafia activities. With Prohibition ending, and tensions between the organized crime groups in the city rising, the impulsive Sonny wishes to join his father's criminal empire.

Reception 
Reception for the novel was mixed to positive, with George De Stefano in New York Journal of Books arguing that "Ed Falco deftly pulls off a feat of literary necromancy, bringing back to life one of the most iconic figures in American popular culture: Don Vito Corleone." The Washington Posts Patrick Anderson wrote, "Falco has captured Puzo's rich prose style and eye for detail.  If you want to read another installment of the Corleone story, The Family Corleone is a solid piece of work." Kirkus Reviews gave it a positive review, calling it: "A worthy addition to the lurid world of the Five Families."

Film adaptation 
The estate of Puzo had sought to keep Paramount Pictures from producing a feature film based on the novel. The case was resolved with Paramount gaining the rights to make more Godfather films.

Audiobook 
An audiobook of The Family Corleone read by Bobby Cannavale was produced by Hachette Audio.

References 

2012 American novels
Novels set in the 1930s
Prequel novels
The Godfather novels
Fiction set in 1933
Novels set in New York City
Grand Central Publishing books